James Cottrell may refer to:
 James Edward Cottrell, American anesthesiologist
 James La Fayette Cottrell, U.S. Representative from Alabama
 Jim Cottrell, American football linebacker